Clintonia umbellulata, commonly known as white clintonia or speckled wood-lily, is a species of flowering plant in the lily family Liliaceae. The specific epithet umbellulata means "umbelled," which refers to the shape of the plant’s inflorescence.

Description

Clintonia umbellulata is a perennial herbaceous plant that spreads by means of underground rhizomes. Each flower has six tepals and six stamens. The stamens are 60% longer than the tepals.

Similar species

Because of their proximity, Clintonia umbellulata and C. borealis are often confused. The following table compares the two species character by character (with diagnostic characters emphasized):

Based on morphological characters alone, bare-leaved plants may be difficult to identify. In this case, Clintonia umbellulata is distinguished from C. borealis by the presence of hairs longer than 1 millimeter on the underside midvein.

C. umbellulata has numerous look-alikes. For example, the inflorescence of the small white leek (Allium tricoccum) is very similar in appearance. To distinguish the two, look at the leaves. The leaves of A. tricoccum have usually wilted by the time the plant is in full bloom while the leaves of C. umbellulata remain throughout the summer months.

Taxonomy

In 1803, André Michaux described the species Convallaria umbellulata Michx., a name that was to become a synonym for Clintonia umbellulata (Michx.) Morong. The latter was first described by Thomas Morong in 1894.

In 1933, John Kunkel Small described the segregate species Xeniatrum umbellulatum, a distinction that did not persist. Numerous other synonyms are in use. Perhaps the best known is Clintonia alleghaniensis Harned, which unlike C. umbellulata has ultramarine blue (not black) fruit. It is known to occur at a number of sites in Virginia, Maryland, and West Virginia.

Distribution

Clintonia umbellulata is endemic to the Appalachian Mountains in the eastern United States, from New York to Georgia. Counties where the species is known to occur are listed below:

 New York: Allegany, Cattaraugus, Chautauqua, Erie, Livingston, Wyoming
 Ohio: Ashland, Ashtabula, Columbiana, Coshocton, Harrison, Holmes, Jefferson, Mahoning, Portage, Summit, Trumbull, Tuscarawas, Wayne
 Pennsylvania: Allegheny, Armstrong, Beaver, Bedford, Blair, Butler, Cambria, Centre, Clarion, Clearfield, Crawford, Elk, Erie, Fayette, Forest, Franklin, Fulton, Greene, Huntingdon, Indiana, Jefferson, Lawrence, Mercer, Somerset, Venango, Warren, Washington, Westmoreland
 Maryland: Allegany, Garrett
 West Virginia: Barbour, Braxton, Fayette, Grant, Greenbrier, Hampshire, Hardy, Kanawha, Lincoln, Logan, Marion, McDowell, Mercer, Mineral, Mingo, Monongalia, Monroe, Morgan, Nicholas, Pocahontas, Preston, Randolph, Ritchie, Summers, Tucker, Upshur, Wayne, Webster, Wetzel, Wyoming
 Virginia: Albemarle, Alleghany, Amherst, Augusta, Bath, Bedford, Bland, Botetourt, Buchanan, Carroll, Craig, Dickenson, Floyd, Franklin, Giles, Grayson, Greene, Henry, Highland, Lee, Madison, Montgomery, Nelson, Page, Patrick, Pulaski, Rappahannock, Roanoke, Rockbridge, Rockingham, Russell, Scott, Smyth, Tazewell, Warren, Washington, Wise, Wythe
 Kentucky: Bell, Breathitt, Clay, Harlan, Jackson, Laurel, Lee, Letcher, Menifee, Morgan, Perry, Powell, Rockcastle, Rowan, Wolf
 Tennessee: Blount, Campbell, Carter, Cocke, Cumberland, Greene, Hawkins, Johnson, Monroe, Morgan, Polk, Rhea, Sequatchie, Sevier, Sullivan, Unicoi
 North Carolina: Alleghany, Ashe, Avery, Buncombe, Burke, Caldwell, Clay, Graham, Haywood, Henderson, Jackson, Macon, Madison, McDowell, Mitchell, Polk, Rutherford, Surry, Swain, Transylvania, Watauga, Wilkes, Yancey
 South Carolina: Greenville, Oconee, Pickens
 Georgia: Gilmer, Habersham, Lumpkin, Murray, Rabun, Towns, Union, White

The range of C. umbellulata apparently overlaps with that of C. borealis throughout the Appalachian Mountains. (Counties where both species are known to occur are shown above in bold.) Actually C. umbellulata and C. borealis are allopatric, that is, the ranges of the two species do not significantly overlap but are immediately adjacent to one another.

C. umbellulata is globally secure, rare and imperiled in New York, and endangered in Ohio.

See also

 Speckled Wood (disambiguation)

References

External links

 

umbellulata
Flora of the Northeastern United States
Flora of the Southeastern United States
Flora of the Appalachian Mountains
Plants described in 1803
Taxa named by André Michaux